Sisyphus (formerly S / S / S) is a collaborative project between Serengeti,  Ryan Lott (under the moniker Son Lux) and Sufjan Stevens.

History
The trio released their debut EP, Beak & Claw, on Anticon in 2012. It features vocal contributions from Shara Worden and Doseone. In 2013 the trio changed their name to Sisyphus. In an interview, Stevens said, "S/S/S started to sound like the Nazi Schutzstaffel with a lisp, so we had to change it." The name is inspired in part by the art of Jim Hodges, whose work is featured on the cover of their self-titled debut full-length album, which was released on March 18, 2014. Stevens says the "gold and metallic boulders Jim made were an obvious influence on our name change"—a reference to four steel-clad boulders installed at the Walker Art Center in Minneapolis. Sisyphus performed at opening of Hodges' retrospective at the Walker on February 14, 2014.

Discography
 Beak & Claw EP (Anticon, 2012)
 Sisyphus (Asthmatic Kitty/Joyful Noise, 2014)

References

External links
 Beak & Claw on Bandcamp
 Sisyphus on Bandcamp

Anticon
Musical groups established in 2012
American musical trios
American supergroups
Alternative hip hop groups
American indie pop groups
American electronic music groups
2012 establishments in the United States
Sufjan Stevens
Asthmatic Kitty artists
Joyful Noise Recordings artists